National Highway 547E, commonly referred to as NH 547E is a national highway in  India. It is a spur road of National Highway 47. NH-547E traverses the state of Maharashtra in India.

Route 
Saoner, Dhapewada, Kalmeshwar, Gondkhairi.

Junctions  

  Terminal near Saoner.
  Terminal near Gondkhairi.

See also 

 List of National Highways in India
 List of National Highways in India by state

References

External links 
 NH 547E on OpenStreetMap

National highways in India
National Highways in Maharashtra